Chloricala is a genus of beetles in the family Buprestidae, containing the following species:

 Chloricala balachowskyi Descarpentries, 1974
 Chloricala gratiosa Kerremans, 1893

References

Buprestidae genera